Qalat (also Romanized as Qalāt; also known as Kalāt and Kyalyat) is a village in Dast Jerdeh Rural District, Chavarzaq District, Tarom County, Zanjan Province, Iran. At the 2006 census, its population was 519, in 134 families.

References 

Populated places in Tarom County